Qareh Bolagh (also Romanized as Qarah Bolāgh) Mr behzad says that qarebolagh is a village in Harzandat-e Gharbi Rural District, in the Central District of Marand County, East Azerbaijan Province, Iran. At the 2006 census, its population was 124, in 29 families.

References 

Populated places in Marand County